International Max Planck Research School for Neurosciences, also known as IMPRS for Neurosciences, is a 1½-year MSc program or a 4-year PhD program with a possibility to have MD-PhD degree for those who have completed a medical school. The first year is common for both tracks, after which students take a qualifying examination and decide whether to work towards a MSc or PhD thesis. A maximum of twenty students are admitted annually to the program, half of whom are to be international students.

As Göttingen is regarded as one of the focal points in neuroscience research in Germany, this international graduate school is providing various and diverse research opportunities in the fields of the neuroscience, biochemistry, structural biology and related disciplines.

Participating institutions in this program are:
 University of Göttingen 
 Max Planck Institute for Biophysical Chemistry (MPI-bpc)
 Max Planck Institute for Experimental Medicine (MPI-em)
 Max Planck Institute for Dynamics and Self-Organization (MPI-ds)
 German Primate Center (DPZ) - Leibniz Institute 
 European Neuroscience Institute Göttingen (ENI)

References

 Website

Max Planck Society